La vérité is the second studio album by English new wave band Classix Nouveaux, released in 1982 by record label Liberty. It reached number 44 in the UK Albums Chart, their highest-charting album to date.

Reception 

Smash Hits magazine gave a mostly positive review, likening the band to Ultravox but stating that they took themselves too seriously. Trouser Press called the album "over the top, being far too intricate and overblown".

Track listing

Personnel
Sal Solo - lead vocals, keyboards, synthesizer, guitar
Mik Sweeney - bass guitar, keyboards, synthesizer, backing vocals
Gary Steadman - guitar, guitar synthesizer
B.P. Hurding - drums, percussion, saxophone
Technical
Ron Hill - engineer
Mark McGuire, Tim Palmer - tape op
Simon Fowler - cover photography

References

External links 
 

1982 albums
Classix Nouveaux albums
Liberty Records albums